is a Japanese animation studio specializing in CGI animation. The studio was founded in 2003, later becoming formally incorporated in 2006 by former employees of Gonzo, and has contributed to various anime series and films. Sanzigen joined the Japanese joint holding company Ultra Super Pictures with studios Ordet and Trigger, that would later be joined by Liden Films.

On December 13, 2019, Bushiroad announced that it had acquired 8.2% of Sanzigen. Ultra Super Pictures now owns 75.4% of Sanzigen and studio president Hiroaki Matsuraa owns 16.4% of the company.

On February 10, 2020, it was announced that Sanzigen had formed a partnership with Millepensee to form a new CG studio IXIXI.

Television series
Black Rock Shooter (2012; co-production with Ordet)
Wooser's Hand-to-Mouth Life (2012)
Miss Monochrome (2013–2015; co-production with Liden Films)
Arpeggio of Blue Steel -Ars Nova- (2013)
Wooser's Hand-to-Mouth Life: Kakusei-hen (2014; co-production with Liden Films)
The Heroic Legend of Arslan (2015; co-production with Liden Films)
Wooser's Hand-to-Mouth Life: Mugen-hen (2015)
Heavy Object (2015–2016; 3DCG; animation production by J.C. Staff)
Bubuki Buranki (2016)
Bubuki Buranki 2: The Gentle Giants of the Galaxy (2016)
ID-0 (2017)
BanG Dream! Girls Band Party! Pico (2018–2022, co-production with DMM.futureworks)
BanG Dream! (2019–2020; second and third seasons)
Sakura Wars the Animation (2020)
Argonavis from BanG Dream! (2020)
D4DJ First Mix (2020–2021)
D_Cide Traumerei the Animation (2021)
BanG Dream! Morfonication (2022)
D4DJ All Mix (2023)

OVA/ONAs
The Heroic Legend of Arslan (2016, with Liden Films)
Sorcery in the Big City (2017)

Animated films
009 Re:Cyborg (2012; co-production with Production I.G)
Initial D Legend 1: Awakening (2014; co-production with Liden Films)
Initial D Legend 2: Racer (2015; co-production with Liden Films)
Arpeggio of Blue Steel: Ars Nova DC (2015)
Arpeggio of Blue Steel: Ars Nova Cadenza (2015)
Initial D Legend 3: Dream (2016; co-production with Liden Films)
Promare (2019; 3DCG work for Studio Trigger)
BanG Dream! Film Live (2019)
BanG Dream! Episode of Roselia: Promise (2021)
BanG Dream! Episode of Roselia: Song I am. (2021)
BanG Dream! Film Live 2nd Stage (2021)
Gekijōban Argonavis: Ryūsei no Obligato (2021)
BanG Dream! Poppin' Dream! (2022)
Gekijōban Argonavis Axia (2023)

Video games
Fire Emblem: Three Houses (2019) – CGI Animation
Sakura Wars (2019) – CGI Animation
 Super Smash Bros. Ultimate  (2020) – CGI Animation (Byleth Reveal Trailer)

References

External links 

 

 
Bushiroad
Japanese animation studios
Japanese companies established in 2003
Mass media companies established in 2003
Ultra Super Pictures
Joint ventures
Suginami